Huitonglu station may refer to:

 Huitonglu station (Nanjing Metro), a station on Line 4 (Nanjing Metro)
 Huitonglu station (Shijiazhuang Metro), a station on Line 3 (Shijiazhuang Metro)